Sand Brook is an unincorporated community located within Delaware Township in Hunterdon County, New Jersey, United States.

The Sand Brook Historic District is a historic district which was listed on the National Register of Historic Places in 2013.  The district included 16 contributing buildings, six contributing structures, and two contributing sites. It is located at County Road 523, Sand Brook-Headquarters & Britton Roads. It includes Greek Revival and Late Victorian architecture.

References

Delaware Township, Hunterdon County, New Jersey
Unincorporated communities in Hunterdon County, New Jersey
Unincorporated communities in New Jersey
National Register of Historic Places in Hunterdon County, New Jersey
Historic districts on the National Register of Historic Places in New Jersey
Greek Revival architecture in New Jersey
Victorian architecture in New Jersey